Mike Johnson (born December 27, 1987) is an American television personality and portfolio manager. He received national recognition after appearing as a contestant on season 15 of The Bachelorette before being eliminated by Hannah Brown during week 7 of the show. After being eliminated from The Bachelorette, he began appearing on season 6 of Bachelor in Paradise, but was sent home during the rose ceremony in week 10.

Personal life 
Johnson is originally from Grand Prairie, Texas. He is a United States Air Force veteran. Prior to being a television personality, he was a financial adviser. He was being considered to be the bachelor for season 24 but Peter Weber was chosen instead.

References 

Living people
1987 births
People from San Antonio
People from Texas
Bachelor Nation contestants
Television personalities from Texas